International Training Center for Bankers (ITCB), or Bankárképző is a Budapest-based banking academy and consultancy.

ITCB  was founded in 1988 by Centre de Formation de la Profession Bancaire, the French banking academy and the post-Socialist commercial banks in Hungary to promote the know-how transfer of economics, finance and commercial banking in the first years of Hungary’s successful economic transition to a market economy. After the restructuring and early privatization, ITCB has remained Hungary’s market-leader banking consulting, training and research company. As Hungary was a regional champion in liberalizing, privatizing and opening her banking and financial markets, ITCB's trainers and consultants have played important roles in the dissemination of this know-how in Central Europe, the Balkans and the former Soviet republics.

International Training Centre for Bankers is part of the Certification & Accreditation System for Financial Services Sector Education and Training is a transnational project, started in October 2006, being developed in the framework of the Leonardo da Vinci Programme, which is supported by the European Banking Federation and co-ordinated by the European Banking and Financial Services Training Association.

See also
 List of banks in Hungary

External links 
 International Training Centre for Bankers
 Centre de Formation de la Profession Bancaire
 EBTN National Reference Centers

Education companies of Hungary
Banking schools